A vactrain (or vacuum tube train) is a proposed design for very-high-speed rail transportation. It is a maglev (magnetic levitation) line using partly evacuated tubes or tunnels. This is 5–6 times the speed of sound in Earth's atmosphere at sea level.

18th century

In 1799, George Medhurst of London conceived of and patented an atmospheric railway that could convey people or cargo through pressurized or evacuated tubes.  The early atmospheric railways and pneumatic tube transport systems (such as the Dalkey Atmospheric Railway) relied on steam power for propulsion.

19th century
In 1888, Michel Verne, son of Jules Verne, imagined a submarine pneumatic tube transport system that could propel a passenger capsule at speeds up to  under the Atlantic Ocean (a transatlantic tunnel) in a short story called "An Express of the Future".

20th century
The vactrain proper was invented by Robert H. Goddard as a freshman at Worcester Polytechnic Institute in the United States in 1904.  Goddard subsequently refined the idea in a 1906 short story called "The High-Speed Bet" which was summarized and published in a Scientific American editorial in 1909 called "The Limit of Rapid Transit".  Esther, his wife, was granted a US patent for the vactrain in 1950, five years after his death.

In 1909, Russian professor  built the world's first model of his proposed version of the vactrain at Tomsk Polytechnic University. He later published a vactrain concept in 1914 in the book Motion without friction (airless electric way).

Later in April 1962, the vactrain appears in the story "Mercenary" by Mack Reynolds, where he mentions Vacuum Tube Transport in passing.

During the 1970s, a leading vactrain advocate, Robert M. Salter of RAND, published a series of elaborate engineering articles.

An interview with Robert Salter appeared in the Los Angeles Times (June 11, 1972). He discussed, in detail, the relative ease with which the U.S. government could build a tube shuttle system using technologies available at that time. Maglev being poorly developed at the time, he proposed steel wheels. The chamber's door to the tube would be opened, and enough air admitted behind to accelerate the train into the tube. Gravity would further accelerate the departing train down to cruise level. Rising from cruise level, the arriving train would decelerate by compressing the rarefied air ahead of it, which would be vented. Pumps at the stations would make up for losses due to friction or air escaping around the edges of the train, the train itself requiring no motor. This combination of modified (shallow) gravity train and atmospheric railway propulsion would consume little energy but limit the system to subsonic speeds, hence initial routes of tens or hundreds of miles or kilometers rather than transcontinental distances were proposed.

Trains were to require no couplers, each car being directly welded, bolted, or otherwise firmly connected to the next, the route calling for no more bending than the flexibility of steel could easily handle. At the end of the line, the train would be moved sideways into the end chamber of the return tube. The railway would have both an inner evacuated tube and an outer tunnel. At cruise depth, the space between would have enough water to float the vacuum tube, softening the ride.

A route through the Northeast Megalopolis was laid out, with nine stations, one each in Washington DC, Maryland, Delaware, Pennsylvania, New York, Rhode Island, Massachusetts, and two in Connecticut. Commuter rail systems were mapped for the San Francisco and New York areas, the commuter version having longer, heavier trains, to be propelled less by air and more by gravity than the intercity version. The New York system was to have three lines, terminating in Babylon, Paterson, Huntington, Elizabeth, White Plains, and St. George.

Salter pointed out how such a system would help reduce the environmental damage being done to the atmosphere by aviation and surface transportation. He called underground Very High Speed Transportation (tube shuttles) his nation's "logical next step". The plans were never taken to the next stage.

At the time these reports were published, national prestige was an issue as Japan had been operating its showcase shinkansen for several years and maglev train research was hot technology. The American Planetran would establish a transcontinental subway service in the United States and provide a commute from Los Angeles to New York City in one hour. The tunnel would be buried to a depth of several hundred feet in solid rock formations. Construction would make use of lasers to ensure alignment and use tungsten probes to melt through igneous rock formations. The tunnel would maintain a partial vacuum to minimize drag. A trip would average  and subject passengers to accelerations up to 1.4 times that of gravity, requiring the use of gimballed compartments. Enormous construction costs (estimated as high as US$1 trillion) were the primary reason why Salter's proposal was never built.

In the 1980s, Frank P. Davidson, a founder and chairman of the Channel Tunnel project, and Japanese engineer  tackled the transoceanic problems with a proposal to float a tube above the ocean floor, anchored with cables (a submerged floating tunnel).

On November 18, 1991, Gerard K. O'Neill filed a patent application for a vactrain system. He called the company he wanted to form VSE International, for velocity, silence, and efficiency.  However, the concept itself he called Magnetic Flight.  The vehicles, instead of running on a pair of tracks, would be elevated using electromagnetic force by a single track within a tube (permanent magnets in the track, with variable magnets on the vehicle), and propelled by electromagnetic forces through tunnels. He estimated the trains could reach speeds of up to  – about five times faster than a jet airliner – if the air was evacuated from the tunnels. To obtain such speeds, the vehicle would accelerate for the first half of the trip, and then decelerate for the second half of the trip. The acceleration was planned to be a maximum of about one-half of the force of gravity. O'Neill planned to build a network of stations connected by these tunnels, but he died two years before his first patent on it was granted.

21st century
In 2001, James R. Powella co-inventor of superconducting maglev in the 1960sbegan leading an investigation into the prospect of using a maglev vactrain for space launch, dubbed StarTram. Theoretically, this would incur two orders of magnitude less cost than current rockets. The StarTram proposal would have vehicles reach up to  within a lengthy acceleration tunnel.

ET3 claim to have achieved some work that resulted in a patent on "evacuated tube transport technology" which was granted in 2009. They presented their idea in 2013 on public stage.

In August 2013 Elon Musk, CEO of Tesla and SpaceX, published the Hyperloop Alpha paper, proposing and examining a route running from the Los Angeles region to the San Francisco Bay Area, roughly following the Interstate 5 corridor. The Hyperloop concept has been explicitly "open-sourced" by Musk and SpaceX, and others have been encouraged to take the ideas and further develop them.

To that end, a few companies have been formed, and several interdisciplinary student-led teams are working to advance the technology. SpaceX built an approximately  subscale track for its pod design competition at its headquarters in Hawthorne, California.

In the 2022 book Road to Nowhere, technology writer Paris Marx claimed Musk had admitted that the hyperloop proposal was simply an attempt to cause the cancellation of a high speed rail project in California.

See also

 Beach Pneumatic Transit

References

External links
 Worcester Polytechnic Institute page discussing Goddard's achievements
 Vac Trains at Orion's Arm
 Rail Journal
 Popular science
 Hydrogen Tube Vehicle
 China Plans 1,000 km/h Super Train
 Cargocap

Emerging technologies
High-speed rail
Proposed infrastructure
Vacuum systems